Jocelyne Béroard (born 12 September 1954) is a Martinican singer and songwriter. She is one of the lead singers of the Zouk and Compas band Kassav'. As a solo artist, she helped create zouk Beton, a music genre started by Kassav'. The main members are from Guadeloupe and Martinique.

Biography

Béroard was born in Fort-de-France, Martinique, and studied in France, attending the National School of Fine Arts in Paris, before beginning to work with Caribbean artistes as a background singer in 1980. She has served as a lead singer of Kassav' since 1983.  She has also recorded several albums as a solo artist. In 1986, she won a Gold Disc for her album Siwo (the all-time biggest seller for an album by a female in the West Indies). In 1987, she recorded a duet with Philippe Lavil, the hit single "Kolé séré", which peaked at number four in France. In 1999, she was made a Chevalier de la Légion d’Honneur.

In 2014, she sang "On n'oublie pas" (written by Serge Bilé) with several artists and personalities including Alpha Blondy, Harry Roselmack and Admiral T. This song is a tribute to the 152 victims from Martinique of the crash of 16 August 2005, to remember this event and to help the AVCA, the association of the victims of the air disaster, to raise funds.

She helped American singer-songwriter Jimmy Buffett write the song "Love and Luck", which appeared on the compilation album Boats, Beaches, Bars & Ballads. The song mentions the Kassav song "Kolé Sére".

On 1 April 2019, it was announced on Kassav's official Facebook page that Béroard was to marry her longtime fellow Jacob Desvarieux, singer and musician of the band and that the festivities were to take place on the day Kassav' will celebrate their 40 years. The announcement later proved to be a joke for April Fools' Day.

Discography

Filmography

Feature films

Short films

Television

Awards and recognition

Honours
Legion of Honour
 1999 – Chevalier (Knight) of the Legion of Honour
 2014 – Officier (Officer) of the Legion of Honour

Awards 
 Prix SACEM SACEM Martinique Best Female (1991)
 Prix SACEM Martinique of Best Songwriter ( for Ké sa lévé, 1995)
 Prix SACEM SACEM Martinique Best Female (for Ahidjéré, song of the movie L’Exil de Behanzin, 1997) 
 Prix SACEM Martinique of Best Songwriter (for Eti’w, co-authored by Dédé Saint Prix, 1995)
 Prix SACEM SACEM Martinique Best Female et Prix SACEM SACEM Martinique Best Ballad (with Giles Voyer) (for Pou I pe sa Tjenbe, 2008)

Bibliography
 Gladys M. Francis, " Résister au compromis, crever la douleur, dire le silence : Entretien avec Jocelyne Béroard." Amour, sexe genre et trauma dans la Caraïbe Francophone. Coll. Espaces Littéraires, L'Harmattan, Paris, 2016, p. 227–250

References

External links

[ Biography on All Music Guide]
Official Site (in French)
 

1954 births
Living people
People from Fort-de-France
Zouk musicians
Officiers of the Légion d'honneur
20th-century French women singers
French women singer-songwriters
Recipients of orders, decorations, and medals of Senegal